9694 Lycomedes  is a Jupiter trojan from the Greek camp, approximately  in diameter. It was discovered during the Palomar–Leiden survey at the Palomar Observatory in 1960 and later named after Lycomedes from Greek mythology. The dark Jovian asteroid is likely elongated in shape and has a rotation period of 18.2 hours.

Discovery 

Lycomedes was discovered on 26 September 1960, by Dutch astronomer couple Ingrid and Cornelis van Houten at Leiden, on photographic plates taken by astronomer Tom Gehrels at the Palomar Observatory in California. The body's observation arc begins the night after its official discovery observation at Palomar.

Palomar–Leiden survey 

The survey designation "P-L" stands for "Palomar–Leiden", named after Palomar and Leiden observatories, which collaborated on the fruitful Palomar–Leiden survey in the 1960s. Gehrels used Palomar's Samuel Oschin telescope (also known as the 48-inch Schmidt Telescope), and shipped the photographic plates to Ingrid and Cornelis van Houten at Leiden Observatory where astrometry was carried out. The trio are credited with the discovery of several thousand asteroids.

Naming 

This minor planet was named from Greek mythology after Lycomedes, the Greek king of Scyros. At the request of Thetis, he concealed her son Achilles dressed in girl's clothes among his own daughters to save him from the Trojan War until Odysseus drew him out of his disguise. The official naming citation was published by the Minor Planet Center on 2 April 1999.

Orbit and classification 

As all Jupiter trojans, Lycomedes is in a 1:1 orbital resonance with Jupiter. It is located in the leading Greek camp at the Gas Giant's  Lagrangian point, 60° ahead on its orbit .

It orbits the Sun at a distance of 4.9–5.3 AU once every 11 years and 6 months (4,206 days; semi-major axis of 5.1 AU). Its orbit has an eccentricity of 0.04 and an inclination of 5° with respect to the ecliptic.

Physical characteristics 

Lycomedes is an assumed C-type asteroid, while most larger Jupiter trojans are D-types.

Rotation period 

In October 2010, a first rotational lightcurve of Lycomedes was obtained from photometric observations by astronomers at the Palomar Transient Factory in California. Lightcurve analysis gave a rotation period of  hours with a brightness amplitude of 0.38 magnitude.

In November 2011, follow-up observations over two consecutive nights were made by Daniel Coley at the Goat Mountain Astronomical Research Station  in California. It gave a concurring rotation period of  hours with a high brightness amplitude of 0.55 magnitude, indicative of a non-spherical shape.

Diameter and albedo 

According to the survey carried out by the NEOWISE mission of NASA's Wide-field Infrared Survey Explorer, Lycomedes measures between 31.736 and 31.74 kilometers in diameter and its surface has an albedo, while the Collaborative Asteroid Lightcurve Link assumes a standard albedo for a carbonaceous asteroid of 0.057 and calculates a diameter of 40.33 kilometers based on an absolute magnitude of 10.7.

Notes

References

External links 
 Lightcurve Database Query (LCDB), at www.minorplanet.info
 Dictionary of Minor Planet Names, Google books
 Discovery Circumstances: Numbered Minor Planets (5001)-(10000) – Minor Planet Center
 Asteroid 9694 Lycomedes at the Small Bodies Data Ferret
 
 

009694
Discoveries by Cornelis Johannes van Houten
Discoveries by Ingrid van Houten-Groeneveld
Discoveries by Tom Gehrels
6581
Named minor planets
19600926